Regiment North Natal was an infantry battalion of the South African Army. As a reserve force unit, it had a status roughly equivalent to that of a British Army Reserve or United States Army National Guard unit.

History
Regiment North Natal was established in the 1950s at Paulpietersburg and named originally as Regiment Smuts.

The regiment was renamed Regiment North Natal in 1961 and its headquarters was moved to Vryheid. Members served in Owamboland in northern South West Africa from 1976 to 1980. 
The headquarters was finally moved again to Newcastle around 1980.

Border War
The regiment served in numerous deployments in the Border War in SWA/Namibia where 4 active companies and about 800 Citizen Force members served in the operational and border areas.

Democratic elections of 1994
In 1994 the regiment provided reaction force support to the police for South Africa's first democratic elections.

Disbandment
Regiment North Natal was disbanded in 1997.

Battle honours

Freedom of the City
Freedom of Vryheid in 1961.

Leadership

Regimental emblems

Dress Insignia

Roll of Honour

References

1950 establishments in South Africa
Infantry regiments of South Africa
Military units and formations of South Africa in the Border War
Military units and formations established in 1950
South African Army